Peter Ross Graham (born 5 September 1940)  is a retired Justice of the Federal Court of Australia, serving from 2005 to 2010.

Education and Career
He studied at the University of Sydney and Harvard University, becoming a barrister in 1966 and Queen's Counsel in 1982.

References

1940 births
Living people
Judges of the Federal Court of Australia
Harvard University alumni
Australian King's Counsel
Judges of the Supreme Court of the Australian Capital Territory
21st-century Australian judges
Australian expatriates in the United States